Il Blues della domenica sera is a 1951 Italian short documentary film directed by Valerio Zurlini.

External links
 

1951 films
1950s Italian-language films
Films scored by Mario Nascimbene
Italian documentary films
1951 documentary films
1950s Italian films